Henry Brannon (November 26, 1837 – November 24, 1914) was a justice of the Supreme Court of Appeals of West Virginia from January 1, 1889 to December 31, 1912.

Born in Winchester, Virginia, Brannon graduated from the University of Virginia in 1858. He thereafter moved to Weston, Virginia, reading law to gain admission to the bar in 1859. He was elected prosecuting attorney of Lewis County, Virginia, in 1860. In 1871, he represented the county in the West Virginia House of Delegates, and in 1880, he was elected to a seat on the West Virginia eleventh judicial circuit, succeeding his own older brother, John Brannon. In 1888, Brannon was elected to a twelve-year terms on the state supreme court, taking office the following January. Initially a Democrat, Brannon ran as a Republican in his successful 1900 reelection campaign. Following his service on the court, he returned to private practice until his death.

Brannon died in Weston, West Virginia, at the age of 77, having argued a case before the circuit court the previous day, and complained of feeling ill afterwards. His wife having died several years earlier, he was survived by a son and four daughters.

References

1837 births
1914 deaths
People from Winchester, Virginia
University of Virginia alumni
U.S. state supreme court judges admitted to the practice of law by reading law
Members of the West Virginia House of Delegates
Justices of the Supreme Court of Appeals of West Virginia
People from Weston, West Virginia